Max Pereira (born ) is a former Brazilian male volleyball player. He was part of the Brazil men's national volleyball team. He competed with the national team at the 2000 Summer Olympics in Sydney, Australia, finishing 6th.

See also
 Brazil at the 2000 Summer Olympics

References

External links
 profile at sports-reference.com

1970 births
Living people
Brazilian men's volleyball players
Place of birth missing (living people)
Volleyball players at the 1996 Summer Olympics
Volleyball players at the 2000 Summer Olympics
Olympic volleyball players of Brazil
People from Bauru
Sportspeople from São Paulo (state)